Nationality words link to articles with information on the nation's poetry or literature (for instance, Irish or France).

Events
 Frederick James Furnivall founds the Chaucer Society

Works published

Canada
 James Anderson. Sawney's Letters, or Cariboo Rhymes.
 Charles Mair, Dreamland and Other Poems, Canada

United Kingdom
 William Barnes, Poems of Rural Life in Common English
 Robert Browning:
 Poetical Works, six volumes
 The Ring and the Book, Volumes 1 and 2 this year; a total of 12 books and over 21,000 lines published this year and in 1869
 George Eliot (pen name of Mary Ann Evans), The Spanish Gypsy
 William Morris, The Earthly Paradise, Parts 1 and 2 (Part 3 1869 [although dated 1870], Part 4 1870; complete work in 10 volumes 1872)
 Richard Lewis Nettleship, City of Pygmies (in Greek) (awarded Gaisford Prize for Greek Verse, 1868)
 Menella Bute Smedley and Fanny Hart, published anonymously "By two friends", Poems Written for a Child
 Algernon Charles Swinburne, Siena

United States
 Benjamin Paul Blood, The Colonnades
 Phoebe Cary, Poems of Faith, Hope, and Love
 Adah Isaacs Menken, Infelicia
 Joaquin Miller, Specimens
 John Rollin Ridge, Poems
 Edward Rowland Sill, The Hermitage and Other Poems
 William Wetmore Story, Graffiti d'Italia

Other
 Charles Baudelaire, Curiosités esthétiques, posthumously published, France
 Comte de Lautréamont, pen name of Isidore Lucien Ducasse, first "chant" of Les Chants de Maldoror, a set of prose poems full of Gothic horror (reprinted in a book of miscellaneous poems, Parfums de l'áme 1869; first published in full in 1874); France

Births
Death years link to the corresponding "[year] in poetry" article:
 January 10 – Ozaki Kōyō 尾崎 紅葉, pen name of Ozaki Tokutaro 尾崎 徳太郎 (died 1903), novelist, essayist and haiku poet (surname: Ozaki)
 May 14 – Mary Eliza Fullerton (died 1946), Australian
 August 6 - Paul Claudel (died 1955), French
 August 23 – Edgar Lee Masters (died 1950), American poet, biographer, dramatist and lawyer
 October 29 – Robert Crawford (died 1930), Australian
 December 25 – Ahmed Shawqi أحمد شوقي (died 1932), Egyptian poet and playwright
 December 29 – Kitamura Tokoku 北村透谷, pen-name of Kitamura Montaro (died 1894), Japanese, late Meiji period poet, essayist and a founder of the modern Japanese romantic literary movement (surname: Kitamura)
 Also:
 Mohammed Abdullah Hassan (died 1920), poet and leader of the Dervish movement
 Kavi Kant (died 1923), Indian, Gujarati-language writer and poet, writer of khandakavyas (narrative poems) and ghazals
 K. C. Kesava Pillai (died 1914), Indian, Malayalam-language musician and poet

Deaths
Birth years link to the corresponding "[year] in poetry" article:
 March 29 – Susanna Hawkins (born 1787), Scottish
 April 26 – James Lionel Michael (born 1824), Australian
 June 10 – Charles Harpur (born 1813), Australian
 August 10 – Adah Isaacs Menken (born 1835), American actress, painter and poet
 September 11 – Maria James (born 1793), American poet and domestic servant
 October 13 – Tachibana Akemi, 橘曙覧 (born 1812), Japanese poet and classical scholar (surname: Tachibana)

See also

 19th century in poetry
 19th century in literature
 List of years in poetry
 List of years in literature
 Victorian literature
 French literature of the 19th century
 Poetry

Notes

Poetry
19th-century poetry